148th meridian may refer to:

148th  meridian east, a line of longitude east of the Greenwich Meridian
148th meridian west, a line of longitude west of the Greenwich Meridian